Sir Richard Davies Hanson (6 December 1805 – 4 March 1876), was the fourth Premier of South Australia, from 30 September 1857 until 8 May 1860, and was a Chief Judge from 20 November 1861 until 4 March 1876 on the Supreme Court of South Australia, which is the highest ranking court in the Australian State of South Australia.

Life
Hanson was born in London, the second son of Benjamin Hanson, a fruit merchant and importer, and was educated at a private school in Melbourn, Cambridgeshire. Admitted a solicitor in 1828, he practised briefly in London, becoming a disciple of Edward Gibbon Wakefield in connection with his colonization schemes. Hanson joined The Globe as a political critic early in 1837. In 1838 he went with Lord Durham to Canada as assistant commissioner of inquiry into crown lands and immigration. Hanson worked with Dominick Daly in Canada.

In 1840, on the death of Lord Durham, Hanson settled in Wellington, New Zealand. He there acted as crown prosecutor, but in 1846 moved to South Australia. On his arrival in the colony of South Australia in 1846, Hanson immediately set up a legal practice. He served as Advocate-General and Attorney-General for the colony before election to the seat of City of Adelaide in 1857.

In 1851 Hanson was appointed advocate-general of the colony, initially as a temporary replacement for the ailing William Smillie, made permanent when Smillie died. He took an active share in the passing of many important measures, such as the first Education Act, the District Councils Act of 1852, and the Act of 1856 which granted constitutional government to the colony. In 1856 he was attorney-general in the first ministry under Boyle Travers Finniss; becoming premier himself in 1857. Among the acts passed were the first patents act, an insolvency act, a partial consolidation of the criminal law, and the Torrens real property act, though he was at first opposed to this measure. He also passed an act legalizing marriage with a deceased wife's sister, the first of its kind in the Empire, but the royal assent was refused on this occasion.

After leaving parliament, Hanson replaced Sir Charles Cooper as Chief Justice of the Supreme Court of South Australia in 1861. He was knighted in 1869 by Queen Victoria when he visited England, and was acting Governor of South Australia for 1872–73. In his spare time Hanson gave much time to theological studies. His publications include Law in Nature and Other Papers (1865), The Jesus of History (1869), Letters to and from Rome (1869), The Apostle Paul, and the Preaching of Christianity in the Primitive Church (1875). 

He was elected the first Chancellor of the University of Adelaide; the first vice-chancellor was Augustus Short.

He died in Australia on 4 March 1876.

Personal life
Freemasonry was an integral part of Hanson's personal life. He was elected as a member and initiated into the Craft on 27 November 1834 in London when The Lodge of Friendship, a Lodge especially founded to become South Australia's first Lodge, held its very first meeting. Later he was to rise in position within the Lodge, which still exists to the present day, and ultimately served as its Master.

His summer residence, Woodhouse, near Piccadilly, South Australia, is today owned by the South Australian Scout Association, and used for Scout leader training and private functions and accommodation; the extensive grounds are used for camping and outdoor adventuring.

Richard's brother William Hanson (1810–1875) was an architect and engineer who played a decisive role in the early history of South Australia's railways and waterworks.

Family
Hanson married the widow Ann "Annie" Scanlon (perhaps Scanton), née Hopgood (died 1895) at his home, Sturt Street, Adelaide, on 29 March 1851. Their eldest daughter Sarah Elizabeth "Lisa" Hanson (23 February 1853 – c. 15 January 1930) married barrister Eustace Beardoe Grundy QC at St Johns Church, Adelaide, on 6 July 1876.

Legacy
The following places in South Australia were named after him:
Hanson Street in Adelaide named in 1837 and which was later subsumed by the expanded Pulteney Street in 1967.
The cadastral unit of the Hundred of Hanson created in 1860.
The cadastral unit of the County of Hanson created in 1877.
The town of Hanson which was named in 1940
The seat of Hanson in the South Australian House of Assembly which was created in 1970 and renamed to Ashford in 2002.

See also
 Judiciary of Australia

Notes

References
 
'Hanson, Sir Richard Davies (1805 - 1876)', Australian Dictionary of Biography, Volume 4, MUP, 1972, pp 336–340. Retrieved 20 January 2009

External links
South Australian Parliament - Hanson

|-

|-

|-

|-

|-

| -

1805 births
1876 deaths
Attorneys-General of South Australia
Premiers of South Australia
Chief Justices of South Australia
Administrators of South Australia
English emigrants to colonial Australia
Australian Knights Bachelor
Chancellors of the University of Adelaide
Colony of South Australia judges
19th-century Australian politicians
Judges of the Supreme Court of South Australia
19th-century Australian judges
Members of the South Australian House of Assembly